The 1st Vancouver Film Critics Circle Awards, honoring the best in filmmaking in 2000, were given in 2001.

Winners and nominees

International

Canadian

References

2000
2000 film awards
2000 in Canadian cinema
Vancouver Film Critics Circle